Dorsum Nicol is a wrinkle ridge on the Moon at  in Mare Serenitatis near the border of Mare Tranquilitatis. It is 44 km long and was named after Scottish physicist William Nicol in 1976.

To the south of Dorsum Nicol are the Rimae Plinius and Plinius crater, and to the southeast is the small crater Brackett.  To the north and perpendicular to Dorsum Nicol are the Dorsa Lister.

References

External links

LAC-42
Dorsum Nicol at The Moon Wiki
Dorsum Nicol, a Lunar Reconnaissance Orbiter article

Ridges on the Moon
Mare Serenitatis